The 1994 Omloop Het Volk was the 48th edition of the Omloop Het Volk cycle race and was held on 26 February 1994. The race started and finished in Ghent. The race was won by Wilfried Nelissen.

General classification

References

1994
Omloop Het Nieuwsblad
Omloop Het Nieuwsblad
February 1994 sports events in Europe